This is the discography of the American band BlackGirl.

Albums

Studio albums

Singles

Singles

References

 
Discographies of American artists
Pop music group discographies
Rhythm and blues discographies